Jared Embick is an American college soccer coach, currently serving as head coach of the Akron Zips men's soccer team.

Career
He played college soccer at Indiana Wesleyan University.
He was the head coach for Missouri Baptist University from 2003 and 2006.
He became as assistant at Akron in 2007. Embick was named the national assistant coach of the year for the 2010 season. He became Akron's head coach following the 2012 season. Akron lost in the second round of the NCAA Tournament in 2013. In July 2015, Embick's contract was extended through the 2018 season. Embick led Akron to the 2015, 2017, and 2018 College Cups.

College head coaching record

References

External links
Akron Zips bio

Living people
American soccer coaches
American soccer players
Indiana Wesleyan University alumni
Akron Zips men's soccer coaches
1978 births

Association footballers not categorized by position